Zvonko Pamić (born 4 February 1991) is a Croatian professional footballer who plays as a midfielder for Karlovac.

Club career

Early career
Pamić began his career with NK Žminj where he earned his first professional caps in the 2007–08 season. Together with his brother Alen Pamić and cousin Sandi Križman, they signed for Rijeka in January 2008. They were then sent on loan to Karlovac for the remainder of the season, where their father Igor Pamić was coach at the time. Although his brother and cousin would return to Rijeka for the 2008–09 season, Zvonko spent the next two seasons playing a significant role for Karlovac before leaving for Germany, having never made an official appearance for the Bijeli.

Bayer Leverkusen
On 17 April 2010, Bayer 04 Leverkusen agreed terms with Croatian club Rijeka for the signing of the 19-year-old midfielder on a five-year-deal. On 27 May 2010, Leverkusen loaned Pamić to fellow Bundesliga team SC Freiburg. While being on loan at Freiburg, he made only two official appearances in Bundesliga.

MSV Duisburg loan
On 27 May 2011, it was announced by Bayer Leverkusen that Pamić would join MSV Duisburg for the 2011–12 season on loan. He scored his first goal for the team on November 2011. In his first season with MSV Duisburg, Pamić made total of 24 Bundesliga appearance, adding one in DFB-Pokal. MSV and Bayer reached the agreement about Pamić, and the loan was extended until June 2013. He made another 13 appearances for Duisburg until January 2013.

Dinamo Zagreb
In January 2013, the loan at MSV Duisburg was terminated and Pamić returned to Croatia to join Dinamo Zagreb.
On 25 September 2013 he impressed Dinamo's fans and the Croatian Media becoming the first-ever Croatian player in the history of Dinamo Zagreb to score a goal direct from a Corner kick. Pamić scored the Corner kick-goal in the first round of the 2013–14 Croatian Cup in the match against HNK Suhopolje.
Now Pamić is playing regularly for At one moment, Pamić was a regular first choice and was the top assist provider in Dinamo Zagreb's squad.

Istra 1961, Lokomotiva and Hrvatski Dragovoljac loans
After an injury, Pamić did not become first choice again at Dinamo, and for that reason he was loaned out to NK Istra 1961 from 2014 to 2015, NK Lokomotiva from 2015 to 2016 and NK Hrvatski Dragovoljac in 2018.

Titograd
From June 2018 to January 2019 he played for OFK Titograd during the first part of the 2018–19 Montenegrin First League. While at Titograd, he scored 2 league goals in 11 league games.

Široki Brijeg
On 9 January 2019, Pamić signed a contract with Premier League of Bosnia and Herzegovina club NK Široki Brijeg. He made his debut for Široki on 3 April 2019, in a 2–0 cup semi-final game win against NK TOŠK Tešanj. Pamić made his league debut for Široki Brijeg on 7 April 2019, in a 1–0 home win against NK GOŠK Gabela.

In the 2018–19 season, Pamić and Široki Brijeg finished as Bosnian Cup runner-ups after losing to FK Sarajevo in the final. On 26 May 2019, Pamić surprisingly decided to leave Široki Brijeg.

International career
Pamić also represented Croatia at various youth international levels On 24 July 2010, Pamić scored a hat-trick in a U-19 game against Portugal at the 2010 UEFA European U-19 Championship in France. Croatia won the game 5–0.

Personal life
He is the son of ex-Croatia international footballer and now coach Igor Pamić. Zvonko's older brother was Alen Pamić, a professional footballer who died of a heart attack during a recreational game on 21 June 2013 at the age of 23.

Career statistics

Club

Honours
Dinamo Zagreb 
 Croatian First League: 2012–13
 Croatian Supercup: 2013

Široki Brijeg
Bosnian Cup runner up: 2018–19

Individual
Prva HNL top assist provider: 2009–10
Best Sportsman of the Karlovac County: 2010

References

External links
 

1991 births
Living people
Sportspeople from Pula
Association football midfielders
Croatian footballers
Croatia youth international footballers
Croatia under-21 international footballers
NK Žminj players
HNK Rijeka players
NK Karlovac players
Bayer 04 Leverkusen players
SC Freiburg players
MSV Duisburg players
GNK Dinamo Zagreb players
NK Istra 1961 players
NK Lokomotiva Zagreb players
NK Hrvatski Dragovoljac players
OFK Titograd players
NK Široki Brijeg players
NK Krško players
Croatian Football League players
Bundesliga players
2. Bundesliga players
Regionalliga players
First Football League (Croatia) players
Montenegrin First League players
Premier League of Bosnia and Herzegovina players
Slovenian Second League players
Croatian expatriate footballers
Expatriate footballers in Germany
Croatian expatriate sportspeople in Germany
Expatriate footballers in Montenegro
Croatian expatriate sportspeople in Montenegro
Expatriate footballers in Bosnia and Herzegovina
Croatian expatriate sportspeople in Bosnia and Herzegovina